Michael D. Swords is a retired professor of Natural Science at Western Michigan University, who writes about general sciences and anomalous phenomena, particularly parapsychology, cryptozoology, and ufology, editing the academic publication The Journal of UFO Studies. He is a board member of the J. Allen Hynek Center for UFO Studies.

Biography

In 1962 Swords graduated from the University of Notre Dame with a B.S. He studied biochemistry at Iowa State University (where he earned his M.S.), and at Case Western Reserve University (where he earned his Ph.D. in 1972).

Swords recently retired as a professor of natural sciences at Western Michigan University, where he received a Teaching Excellence award in 1978.

As a ufologist, Swords is an authority on the Condon Committee. 
He was editor of the Journal for UFO Studies.
He was a prominently featured pundit on the prime time 2005 television special Peter Jennings Reporting: UFOs — Seeing Is Believing, discussing the early history of the U.S. Military's UFO investigations (see also Project Sign and Project Grudge.)

Affiliations
 American Association for the Advancement of Science
 American Association of University Professors
 Society for Scientific Exploration

Works
UFOs and Government: A Historical Inquiry (Anomalist Books: 2012) by The UFO History Group, Michael Swords, Robert Powell, Richard Thieme, et al.
, Western Michigan University

References

External links
The CUFON Interview of Michael D. Swords, Ph.D (1995)
French biography on Dr. Michael D. Swords

Western Michigan University faculty
Ufologists
University of Notre Dame alumni
Iowa State University alumni
American biochemists
Living people
Year of birth missing (living people)